Fala ("Speech", also called Xalimego) is a Western Romance language commonly classified in the Galician-Portuguese subgroup, with some traits from Leonese, spoken in Spain by about 10,500 people, of whom 5,500 live in a valley of the northwestern part of Extremadura near the border with Portugal. The speakers of Fala live in the towns of Valverde del Fresno (Valverdi du Fresnu), Eljas (As Ellas) and San Martín de Trevejo (Sa Martín de Trevellu). These are within the valley of Jálama, in the comarca of Sierra de Gata.

Other names sometimes used for the language are Fala de Jálama or Fala de Xálima, but neither of them is used by the speakers themselves, who call their linguistic varieties lagarteiru (in Eljas), manhegu / mañegu (in San Martín de Trevejo) and valverdeiru (in Valverde del Fresno).

History

Origins 

In the Middle Ages, mixed varieties of Portuguese and Leonese could be found along the border between Leon and Portugal, represented in texts such as the Foro de Castelo Rodrigo (13th century). Although there is no documentation on the colonization and repopulation of this area in the 13th century, there are several hypotheses of Galician citizens moving to protect the frontier against Muslims as a punishment imposed by the Leonese king, or the delivery of the territories to various military orders by Kings Alfonso IX and Fernando II.

In general, philologists in favor of the Galician theory support the hypothesis that the valley is an isolated region and, therefore, the Galician colonists maintain their way of speaking in a "pure" form because of the lack of external influences.

Recent 

On August 3, 1992, the association Fala i Cultura was founded, among its goals being the compilation of a common grammar (based on the Galician one) and the commemoration of u día da nosa fala (the day of our language) celebrated once a year from 1992 in Eljas, 1993 in Valverde and 1994 in San Martín.

It was not until 1998 that the first literary work in Fala was published: Seis sainetes valverdeiros, written by Isabel López Lajas and published in 1998 by Edicións Positivas (Santiago de Compostela). It was on this date that the Gabinete de Iniciativas Transfronterizas (Office of Cross-Border Initiatives) started to take interest in Fala and to promote its study, publishing in 1999 scientific works and celebrating in May a "Congress on A Fala".

On June 14, 2000, Fala was recognized by the Ministry of Culture of the Junta de Extremadura as Bien de Interés Cultural. Nowadays, although the inhabitants of Jalama Valley can speak Spanish, most of them are bilingual because at home and in other activities outside school, they continue using the local language.

Sociolinguistic surveys
In 1992, a survey conducted by José Enrique Gargallo Gil (a professor at the University of Barcelona) collected the following data regarding the use of Spanish in family conversation:
4 of the 29 respondents from San Martín used Spanish when speaking with their family (13.8%)
In Eljas the figure dropped to only 3 out of 54 respondents (5.6%)
In Valverde, 25 of 125 respondents used Spanish in this context (20%).

In September/December 1993 a survey was published in issue No. 30 of Alcántara Magazine by José Luis Martín Galindo, which showed the opinion of the people in San Martín de Trevejo as to the nature of Fala in the following percentages:
Believe that Fala is a dialect of Spanish: 13%
Believe that Fala is a dialect of Portuguese: 20%
Believe that Fala is an autonomous language: 67%

The survey involved only twenty people (over 960 neighbours) and there was no alternative answer for those respondents who believed that Fala is a dialect of Galician. It is argued that the absence of this option was logical since theories about the possible relation of Fala with Galician were hardly known.

In 1994, a new study showed that 80% of respondents learned to speak Spanish in school. The percentage of parents who claim to use Fala when speaking with their children was as follows:
100% in Eljas
85% in San Martin
73% in Valverde.

Phonology

Alphabet
One proposed alphabet has 23 letters:

Comparative vocabulary
Some Fala vocabulary are shown in the table below.

See also
Galician-Portuguese
Leonese language
Portuguese language
Galician language
Fala dos arxinas ("stonecutters' speech"), a cant spoken by Galician stonecutters.
Extremaduran language, from Astur-Leonese roots
Castúo, or Extremaduran variety of Spanish
Portuñol

References

Further reading

External links

West Iberian languages of Spain
Languages of Spain
Bienes de Interés Cultural